The 2022 Asian Games, officially known as the 19th Asian Games, also known as Hangzhou 2022,, will be a multi-sport event celebrated in Hangzhou, Zhejiang, China. Hangzhou will be the third Chinese city to host the Asian Games, after Beijing in 1990 and Guangzhou in 2010.

Originally scheduled to take place from 10 to 25 September 2022, the event was announced to be postponed to year 2023 on 6 May 2022 due to concerns of COVID-19 pandemic in China, amid the potential threat of new COVID-19 variants. On 19 July 2022, the new dates were announced to be from 23 September to 8 October 2023.

Bidding process

The Chinese Olympic Committee confirmed that Hangzhou submitted a bid, and is the only city to declare the candidacy in August 2015. Hangzhou was officially awarded as the host city on 16 September 2015 in Ashgabat, Turkmenistan, during the 34th OCA General Assembly.

Venues

44 venues will be used for the Games, including 30 existing facilities and 14 newly constructed venues. Most venues will be within Hangzhou and its districts, while other events will be held in Deqing, Jinhua, Ningbo, Shaoxing and Wenzhou. A new high-speed rail line is being constructed between Hangzhou and Huzhou for the Games.

The Games

Sports
On 8 April 2019, the Olympic Council of Asia initially announced that the Games would feature 37 sports, including the 28 mandatory Olympic sports to be contested at the 2024 Summer Olympics in Paris, as well as events in other non-Olympic sports. This led to the addition of events such as the open-water swimming and the groups competition in rhythmic gymnastics to the Olympic program.

On 12 September 2019, baseball, softball,  karate, and sport climbing (which were optional events at the then-upcoming 2020 Summer Olympics) were added to the programme, expanding it to 61 disciplines in 40 sports. On 18 December 2020, it was announced that esports (which was held as a demonstration event in 2018) and breakdancing (which will debut at the 2024 Summer Olympics) would be added, expanding the programme to 42 sports.

The e-sports programme at the 2022 Asian Games will include eight medal events and two demonstration events, with competitions being held in Arena of Valor, Dota 2, Dream of the Three Kingdoms 2, FIFA, Hearthstone, League of Legends,  PUBG Mobile, and Street Fighter V.

Calendar

Participation 
All the 45 National Olympic Committees who are members of the Olympic Council of Asia are expected to send delegations. In March 2019, the OCA announced plans to invite athletes from countries from Oceania to compete in selected events; this would mark their first participation in the Summer Asian Games, after having participated for the first time overall at the 2017 Asian Winter Games, albeit as "guests" ineligible to receive medals.

In November 2021, it was announced that athletes from Oceania would be invited to compete in athletics, wushu, roller skating, triathlon, and weightlifting; athletes will receive "honorary medals" if they place in an event, and their nation will not be part of the official medal tallies. However, due to the recent outbreak of the COVID-19 pandemic, Australia and New Zealand decided not to send athletes to this Games.

On 26 January 2023, The Olympic Council of Asia (OCA) offered to let Russian and Belarusian athletes to take part in the Asian Games, where athletes from the two nations could compete to qualify at the 2024 Summer Olympics. However, OCA will still abide by the sanctions against Russia and Belarus, and their competition will not impact the Asian Games' outcome.

Marketing

Emblem 
The emblem of the Games, "Surging Tides", was unveiled during a ceremony at the headquarters of the Hangzhou Culture Radio Television Group on 6 August 2018; it is designed to resemble a hand fan, a running track, the Qiantang River, and radio waves (symbolising wireless connectivity). The organising committee stated that the emblem was meant to reflect "the great cause of socialism with Chinese characteristics gathering momentum in the new era", and "the unity, solidarity and development of the OCA."

Mascot 

The three mascots of the Games, Congcong, Lianlian and Chenchen, known collectively as the "Memories of Jiangnan", were unveiled on 3 April 2020. They are depicted as robotic superheroes originating from the Archaeological Ruins of Liangzhu City, the West Lake and the Grand Canal respectively.

Slogan 
The official slogan of the 2022 Asian Games, "Heart to Heart, @Future" was announced on 15 December 2019 to mark 1,000 days before the opening ceremonies. The slogan is intended to symbolise the connectivity that the Asian Games create between the countries of Asia.

See also
Previous Asian Games in China
1990 Asian Games – Beijing
2010 Asian Games – Guangzhou

Notes

References

External links
Organising Committee's official website in Chinese

 
Asian Games
Asian Games
Multi-sport events in China
Asian Games by year
Asian Games
Asian Games 2022
Asian Games 2022